Frank Majoor (born 1 April 1949, Tilburg) is the Permanent Representative of the Kingdom of the Netherlands to NATO. He started in this position in 2009, from 2005 he was the Permanent Representative to the United Nations before which he was the secretary general of the Ministry of Foreign Affairs. He is a member of the Christian Democratic Appeal.

External links
The Permanent Mission of the Kingdom of the Netherlands to the United Nations

1949 births
Living people
Permanent Representatives of the Netherlands to the United Nations
People from Tilburg